Sasom Pobprasert (born 10 October 1967) is a Thai professional football manager and former player who is the current head coach of Thai League 1 club Chonburi.

He is a former footballer in Thailand who played as midfielder for Thailand national team, including an appearance in a 1998 FIFA World Cup qualifying match. He scored one goal for the national team.

He vary from the player and manager to the football pundit with the mantle of commentator who analysis for the football matches alongside TrueVisions and PPTV channel.

In 2009, he became the manager of Thai Premier League side Thai Port F.C.  He has made an instant impact at PAT Stadium and has targeted a top five finish for the 2009 season. He previously managed BEC Tero Sasana from 2004 until early 2005.

Managerial statistics

Honours

Player
Thai Farmers Bank
 Asian Club Championship: 1993-94, 1994-95
 Kor Royal Cup: 1992, 1993, 1995
 Queen's Cup: 1994, 1995, 1996, 1997

BEC Tero Sasana
 Thai Premier League: 2000, 2001-02
 Kor Royal Cup: 2000

Manager
Thailand U16
 AFF U-16 Youth Championship: 2011

Thai Port
 Thai FA Cup: 2009
 Thai League Cup: 2010

Chonburi
 Thai FA Cup runners-up: 2020–21

Individual
Thai League 1 Coach of the Month: September 2021, September 2022

International goals

References

1967 births
Living people
Sasom Pobprasert
Sasom Pobprasert
Sasom Pobprasert
Association football midfielders
Sasom Pobprasert
Sasom Pobprasert
Sasom Pobprasert
Sasom Pobprasert
Sasom Pobprasert